Amber de Botton is a British political aide and journalist. Since 29 October 2022 she has served as the Downing Street Director of Communications, succeeding Guto Harri.

She graduated from Durham University in 2007 with a degree in History and Politics. Following university she embarked on a media career and was Deputy Head of Politics at Sky News for five years until 2017 and then worked at ITV News as Head of Politics and subsequently Head of UK News.

References

Living people
British journalists
Alumni of Durham University
Year of birth missing (living people)
21st-century British women